Kevin Dyson (born 4 May 1967) is a former Australian rules footballer who played for Melbourne and the Sydney Swans in the Australian Football League (AFL) during the 1990s.

Dyson, recruited to Melbourne from Oakleigh, was a consistent performer in his debut AFL season. Playing mostly as a centreman, he appeared in five finals matches while at Melbourne and made his first and only Grand Final when he crossed to Sydney in 1996.

He retired after the 1997 season, due to his job with an electronics and computer company required him to often travel and preventing him from being able to train full-time. He remained in Sydney after retiring from playing, and has recently been involved in setting up a football academy for the Swans.

He is now married to Kyle Alp now has three children, Georgia Dyson, Harrison Dyson and Michaela Dyson.

References

Holmesby, Russell and Main, Jim (2007). The Encyclopedia of AFL Footballers. 7th ed. Melbourne: Bas Publishing.

External links

Demon Wiki profile

1967 births
Living people
Australian rules footballers from Victoria (Australia)
Melbourne Football Club players
Sydney Swans players
Oakleigh Football Club players